This is a list of high schools in the state of Texas.

Anderson County

Cayuga High School, Cayuga
Elkhart High School, Elkhart
Frankston High School, Frankston
Neches High School, Neches
Slocum High School, Slocum

Palestine

Palestine High School
Westwood High School

Andrews County
Andrews High School, Andrews

Angelina County

Central High School, Pollok
Diboll High School, Diboll
Huntington High School, Huntington
Zavalla High School, Zavalla

Lufkin

Hudson High School
Lufkin High School
Pineywoods Community Academy

Aransas County
BTS -Fulton High School, Rockport

Archer County

Archer City High School, Archer City
Holliday High School, Holliday
Windthorst High School, Windthorst

Armstrong County
Claude High School, Claude

Atascosa County

Charlotte High School, Charlotte
Jourdanton High School, Jourdanton
Lytle High School, Lytle
Pleasanton High School, Pleasanton
Poteet High School, Poteet

Austin County

Bellville High School, Bellville
Brazos High School, Wallis
Sealy High School, Sealy

Bailey County
Muleshoe High School, Muleshoe

Bandera County

Bandera High School, Bandera
Medina High School, Medina

Bastrop County
Smithville High School, Smithville

Bastrop

Bastrop High School
Cedar Creek High School
Colorado River Collegiate Academy
Genesis High School

Elgin

Elgin High School
Phoenix High School

Baylor County
Seymour High School, Seymour

Bee County

Pettus High School, Pettus
Skidmore-Tynan High School, Skidmore

Beeville

A C Jones High School
Health Professions Magnet Academy

Bell County

Academy High School, Little River
Bartlett High School Bartlett
Harker Heights High School, Harker Heights
Holland High School, Holland
Rogers High School, Rogers
Salado High School, Salado
Troy High School, Troy

Belton

Belton High School
Belton New Tech High School

Killeen

Chaparral High School
Ellison High School
Killeen High School
Shoemaker High School

Temple

Central Texas Christian School
Holy Trinity Catholic High School
Temple High School
Wheatley Alternative Education Center

Bexar County

 Judson High School, Converse
 Randolph High School, Randolph Air Force Base

Castle Hills

 Antonian College Preparatory High School
 The Christian School at Castle Hills

San Antonio

Public Schools

 Academy of Creative Education
 Alamo Heights High School
 Bexar County Learning Center
 Brackenridge High School
 Brandeis High School
 Brennan High School
 Burbank High School
 Churchill High School
 Clark High School
 Cole High School
 East Central High School
 Edgewood Fine Arts Academy
 Edison High School
 Fox Tech High School
 Harlan High School
 Harlandale High School
 Health Careers High School
 Highlands High School
 Holmes High School/Business Careers High School
 Jay High School/Jay Science/Engineering Academy
 Jefferson High School
 Johnson High School
 Kennedy High School
 Lanier High School
 LEE High School/International School of the Americas/North East Arts/STEM Academy
 MacArthur High School/Electrical Systems Apprenticeship Program
 Madison High School/Agriscience Magnet
 Marshall High School
 McCollum High School
 Memorial High School
 O'Connor High School
 Reagan High School
 Roosevelt High School/Engineering & Technologies Academy/Design & Tech Academy
 Sam Houston High School
 Somerset High School
 Sotomayor High School
 South San Antonio High School
 Southside High School
 Southwest High School
 Stacey High School (Lackland AFB)
 Stevens High School
 Taft High School/Communications Arts High School
 Tejeda Academy
 Veterans Memorial High School
 Wagner High School
 Warren High School/Construction Careers Academy

Charter Schools

Anne Frank Inspire Academy
BASIS Schools San Antonio
 Brooks Academy of Science and Engineering
Brooks Collegiate Academy
Compass Rose Charter School Legacy Campus
Early College High School at Texas A&M University-San Antonio
Gervin Charter Academy 
Great Hearts Schools (Monte Vista North, Northern Oaks)
 Harmony Science Academy - San Antonio
IDEA Charter Schools (Brackenridge, Carver, Eastside, Ewing Halsell, Ingram Hills, Judson, Mays, Monterrey Park, Najim, South Flores, Walzem)
Jubilee Charter Academies (Highland Hills, Highland Park, Lake View, Livingway, San Antonio, Sendero, Westwood)
KIPP Texas Public Schools (Somos, University Prep)
Lee Academy of Science and Engineering
Madla Early College High School
 Por Vida Charter High School
 Sanchez Charter High School
 School of Science & Technology - San Antonio
 Southwest Prep Schools (New Directions, Southeast, Seguin)
Texans Can Academy - San Antonio

Private Schools

 Central Catholic Marianist High School
 Cornerstone Christian School
 Holy Cross High School
 Incarnate Word High School
 Keystone School
 Lutheran High School of San Antonio
 Providence High School
 St. Anthony Catholic High School
 St. Gerard Catholic High School
 Saint Mary's Hall
 San Antonio Christian School
 TMI Episcopal

Blanco County

Blanco High School, Blanco
Lyndon B. Johnson High School, Johnson City

Borden County
Borden County High School, Gail

Bosque County

Cranfills Gap High School, Cranfills Gap
Clifton High School, Clifton
Kopperl High School, Kopperl
Iredell High School, Iredell
Meridian High School, Meridian
Morgan High School, Morgan
Valley Mills High School, Valley Mills
Walnut Springs High School, Walnut Springs

Bowie County

James Bowie High School, Simms
Dekalb High School, Dekalb
Hooks High School, Hooks
Maud High School, Maud
New Boston High School, New Boston
Redwater High School, Redwater

Texarkana

Liberty-Eylau High School
Pleasant Grove High School
Premier Charter School - Texarkana
Texas High School

Brazoria County

Alvin High School, Alvin
Brazosport Christian School, Lake Jackson
Columbia High School, West Columbia
Danbury High School, Danbury
Iowa Colony High School, Iowa Colony
Manvel High School, Manvel
Sweeny High School, Sweeny

Angleton

Angleton High School
Trinity Charter Schools - Angleton

Clute

Brazoswood High School
Lighthouse Alternative Learning Center

Pearland

Glenda Dawson High School
Pearland High School
Robert Turner College and Career High School
Shadow Creek High School

Brazos County

Bryan

Allen Academy
 Brazos Christian School
Bryan Collegiate High School
Bryan High School
Harmony Science Academy - Bryan/College Station
James Earl Rudder High School
St. Joseph Catholic High School

College Station

A&M Consolidated High School
College Station High School
International Leadership Academy of Texas - Aggieland

Brewster County

Alpine High School, Alpine
Marathon High School, Marathon
Big Bend High School, Terlingua

Briscoe County
Silverton High School, Silverton

Brooks County
Falfurrias High School, Falfurrias

Brown County

Bangs High School, Bangs
Blanket High School, Blanket
Brookesmith High School, Brookesmith
Brownwood High School, Brownwood
May High School, May
Zephyr High School, Zephyr

Early

Early High School
Premier Charter School - Early

Burleson County

Caldwell High School, Caldwell
Snook High School, Snook
Somerville High School, Somerville

Burnet County
Burnet High School, Burnet

Marble Falls

Marble Falls High School
Falls Career High School

Caldwell County

Lockhart High School, Lockhart
Luling High School, Luling
Prairie Lea High School, Prairie Lea

Calhoun County

Port Lavaca

Calhoun High School
Hope High School

Callahan County

Baird High School, Baird
Clyde High School, Clyde
Cross Plains High School, Cross Plains
Eula High School, Eula

Cameron County

La Feria High School, La Feria
Los Fresnos High School, Los Fresnos
Port Isabel High School, Port Isabel
Rio Hondo High School, Rio Hondo
Santa Maria High School, Santa Maria
Santa Rosa High School, Santa Rosa

Brownsville

Brownsville Academic Center
Brownsville Early College High School
Brownsville Learning Academy
First Baptist School
Hanna High School
Harmony School of Innovation - Brownsville
IDEA Schools (Brownsville, Frontier, Riverview, Sports Park)
Jubilee Charter Academy - Brownsville
Lincoln Park Alternative School
Lopez High School
Pace High School
Porter High School
Premier Charter School - Brownsville
Saint Joseph Academy
Rivera High School
Triumph School Brownsville
Veterans Memorial High School

Harlingen

Harlingen Collegiate High School
Harlingen High School
Harlingen High School South
Harlingen School of Health Professions
Jubilee Charter Academy - Harlingen
KEYS Academy
Marine Military Academy
Secondary Alternative Center

San Benito

IDEA Schools - San Benito
San Benito High School
Triumph School - San Benito

Camp County
Pittsburg High School, Pittsburg

Carson County

Groom High School, Groom
Panhandle High School, Panhandle
White Deer High School, White Deer

Cass County

Atlanta High School, Atlanta
Avinger High School, Avinger
Bloomburg High School, Bloomburg
Hughes Springs High School, Hughes Springs
Linden-Kildare High School, Linden
McLeod High School, McLeod
Queen City High School, Queen City

Castro County

Dimmitt High School, Dimmitt
Hart Junior-Senior High School, Hart
Nazareth High School, Nazareth

Chambers County

Anahuac High School, Anahuac
Barbers Hill High School, Mont Belvieu
East Chambers High School, Winnie

Cherokee County

Alto High School, Alto
Bullard High School, Bullard
Jacksonville High School, Jacksonville
New Summerfield High School, New Summerfield
Rusk High School, Rusk
Wells High School, Wells

Childress County
Childress High School, Childress

Clay County

Bellevue High School, Bellevue
Henrietta High School, Henrietta
Midway High School, Henrietta
Petrolia High School, Petrolia

Cochran County

Morton High School, Morton
Whiteface High School, Whiteface

Coke County

Bronte High School, Bronte
Robert Lee High School, Robert Lee

Coleman County

Coleman High School, Coleman
Panther Creek High School, Valera
Santa Anna High School, Santa Anna

Collin County

Allen High School, Allen
Anna High School, Anna
Blue Ridge High School, Blue Ridge
Celina High School, Celina
Community High School, Nevada
Farmersville High School, Farmersville
McMillen High School, Murphy
Melissa High School, Melissa
Princeton High School, Princeton

Frisco

Founders Classical Academy - Frisco
Frisco High School
Centennial High School
Heritage High School
Independence High School
Leadership Prep School
Lebanon Trail High School
Legacy Christian Academy
Liberty High School
Lone Star High School
Memorial High School
Panther Creek High School
Reedy High School
Rock Hill High School (Prosper ISD)
Wakeland High School

Lucas

Lovejoy High School
 Lucas Christian Academy

=McKinney

Emerson High School (Frisco ISD)
McKinney High School
McKinney Boyd High School
McKinney Christian Academy
McKinney North High School

Plano

Clark High School
Coram Deo Academy - Plano
Faith Lutheran School
Jasper High School (Plano, Texas)
John Paul II High School
Legacy Prep - Plano
Plano East Senior High School
Plano ISD Academy High School
Plano Senior High School
Plano West Senior High School
Shepton High School
Spring Creek Academy
Vines High School
Williams High School

Prosper

Prestonwood Christian Academy
Prosper High School

Wylie

Achieve Alternative Academy
Wylie East High School
Wylie High School
Wylie Preparatory Academy

Collingsworth County
Wellington High School, Wellington

Colorado County

Columbus High School, Columbus
Rice High School, Altair
Weimar High School, Weimar

Comal County

Canyon Lake High School, Fischer
Smithson Valley High School, Spring Branch

New Braunfels

Calvary Baptist Academy
Canyon High School
New Braunfels Christian Academy
New Braunfels High School
Premier Charter School - New Braunfels

Schertz

Founders Classical Academy - Schertz
John Paul II Catholic High School

Comanche County

De Leon High School, De Leon
Gustine High School, Gustine
Sidney High School, Sidney

Comanche

Comanche High School
Premier Charter School - Comanche

Concho County

Eden High School, Eden
Paint Rock High School, Paint Rock

Cooke County

Callisburg High School, Callisburg
Era High School, Era
Gainesville High School, Gainesville
Lindsay High School (Texas), Lindsay
Valley View High School, Valley View

Muenster

Muenster High School
Sacred Heart Catholic High School

Coryell County

Copperas Cove High School, Copperas Cove
Evant High School, Evant
Jonesboro School, Jonesboro
Gatesville High School, Gatesville
Oglesby High School, Oglesby

Cottle County
Paducah High School, Paducah

Crane County
Crane High School, Crane

Crockett County
Ozona High School, Ozona

Crosby County

Crosbyton High School, Crosbyton
Lorenzo High School, Lorenzo
Ralls High School, Ralls

Culberson County
Van Horn High School, Van Horn

Dallam County

Dalhart High School, Dalhart
Texline High School, Texline

Dallas County

Golden Rule Charter Schools - Wilmer, Wilmer
Highland Park High School, University Park
Lancaster High School, Lancaster
Rowlett High School, Rowlett
Sachse High School, Sachse
Sunnyvale High School, Sunnyvale

Addison

Greenhill School
Trinity Christian Academy

Balch Springs

Balch Springs Christian Academy
KIPP Pleasant Grove Leadership Academy

Cedar Hill

Cedar Hill High School
Cedar Hill Preparatory Academy
Newman International Academy - Cedar Hill
Trinity Christian School

Carrollton

Creekview High School
Harmony Science Academy - Carrollton
Newman Smith High School
 Prince of Peace Christian School
The Saint Anthony School
Texans Can Academy - Carrollton/Farmers Branch
Turner High School

Coppell

Coppell Classical Academy
Coppell High School
Universal Academy - Coppell

Dallas

Public Schools

Adams High School
Adamson High School
Carter High School
Conrad High School
Hillcrest High School
Jefferson High School
Kimball High School
Lake Highlands High School
Lincoln High School
Madison High School
Molina High School	
North Dallas High School
Pinkston High School
Roosevelt High School
Samuell High School
Seagoville High School
Skyline High School
Smith High School
South Oak Cliff High School
Spruce High School	
Sunset High School
White High School
Wilson High School

Career/Magnet High Schools

Angelou High School
Darrell New Tech High School
Gilliam Collegiate Academy
Harmony Science Academy/Harmony School of Innovation - Dallas
Lassiter Early College High School
Obama Male Leadership Academy
Rangel Young Women's Leadership School
Townview Magnet Center
Washington Performing/Visual Arts High School

Charter Schools

A+ Charter Schools (A+ Academy, Inspired Vision)
Cityscape Schools (Buckner, East Grand)
Clay Classical Academy
Gateway Charter Academy
Golden Rule Charter Schools (Pleasant Grove, Sunnyside)
Life School - Oak Cliff 
Pegasus School of Liberal Arts & Sciences
Pioneer Technology & Arts Academy
Richland Collegiate High School
Texans Can Academy (Garland, Grant East, North, Oak Cliff, Pleasant Grove)
UME Prep Academy
Uplift Charter Schools (Atlas, Hampton, Heights, Luna, Williams, Wisdom)
Winfree Academy Dallas

Private Schools

Alcuin School
Bishop Dunne Catholic School
Bishop Lynch High School
The Covenant School
Cristo Rey Dallas College Prep
Dallas Academy
Dallas International School
Dallas Lutheran School
Episcopal School of Dallas
Faith Family Academy
First Baptist Academy of Dallas
The Hockaday School
Jesuit College Preparatory School of Dallas
June Shelton School
Kingdom Collegiate Academies
Lakehill Preparatory School
Logos Academy
Mesorah High School for Girls
Parish Episcopal School
St. Mark's School of Texas
Ursuline Academy of Dallas
 The Winston School
Yavneh Academy of Dallas

DeSoto

DeSoto High School/DeSoto High School-Freshman Campus
Golden Rule Charter Schools - DeSoto Secondary
International Leadership Academy of Texas - Lancaster-DeSoto
Premier Charter School - DeSoto

Duncanville

Duncanville High School
Village Tech School

Garland

Brighter Horizons Academy
Garland Christian Academy
Garland High School
Harmony School of Innovation - Garland
International Leadership Academy of Texas - Garland
Lakeview Centennial High School
Naaman Forest High School
North Garland High School
South Garland High School

Grand Prairie

Advantage Academy - Grand Prairie East
Dubiski Career High School
Golden Rule Charter Schools - Grand Prairie 
Grand Prairie Collegiate Institute
Grand Prairie Fine Arts Academy
Grand Prairie High School
International Leadership School of Texas - Arlington-Grand Prairie High School
South Grand Prairie High School
Uplift Schools - Grand Prairie 
Winfree Academy Grand Prairie
Young Women's Leadership Academy at Arnold

Irving

The Academy of Irving ISD
Cistercian Preparatory School
Great Hearts - Irving
The Highlands School
Irving High School
Islamic School of Irving
MacArthur High School
Nimitz High School
North Lake Early College High School
Premier Charter School - Irving
Ranchview High School
StoneGate Christian Academy
Universal Academy - Irving
Uplift Schools (Infinity, North Hills)
Winfree Academy Irving

Mesquite

Dallas Christian School
Founders Classical Academy - Mesquite
Horn High School
Legacy Prep (Mesquite, West)
Mesquite High School
North Mesquite High School
Poteet High School
Premier Charter School - Mesquite
West Mesquite High School

Richardson

Berkner High School
Canyon Creek Christian Academy
Evolution Academy Richardson
IANT Quranic Academy
North Dallas Adventist Academy
Pearce High School
Richardson High School
Salam Academy
Winfree Academy Richardson

Dawson County

Dawson High School, Welch
Klondike High School, Lamesa
Lamesa High School, Lamesa
Sands High School, Ackerly

Deaf Smith County
Hereford High School, Hereford

Delta County
Cooper High School, Cooper

Denton County

Aubrey High School, Aubrey
Byron Nelson High School, Trophy Club
The Colony High School, The Colony
Krum High School, Krum
Little Elm High School, Little Elm
Northwest High School, Justin
Pilot Point High School, Pilot Point
Ponder High School, Ponder
Sanger High School, Sanger

Argyle

Argyle High School
Liberty Christian School

Carrollton

Creekview High School
Hebron High School

Corinth

Founders Classical Academy - Corinth
Lake Dallas High School

Denton

Braswell High School
Denton Calvary Academy
Denton High School
Guyer High School
Moore High School
Ryan High School
Selwyn School
Texas Academy of Mathematics and Science

Flower Mound

Coram Deo Academy - Flower Mound
Flower Mound High School
Marcus High School
Temple Christian Academy

Haslet

Eaton High School
 Legacy Classical Christian Academy

Lewisville

Founders Classical Academy - Lewisville
iSchool of Lewisville
Lewisville High School
Winfree Academy Lewisville

Dewitt County

Cuero High School, Cuero
Nordheim High School, Nordheim
Yoakum High School, Yoakum
Yorktown High School, Yorktown

Dickens County

Patton Springs High School, Afton
Spur High School, Spur

Dimmit County
Carrizo Springs High School, Carrizo Springs

Donley County
Clarendon High School, Clarendon
Hedley High School, Hedley

Duval County

Benavides High School, Benavides
Freer High School, Freer
San Diego High School, San Diego

Eastland County

Cisco High School, Cisco
Eastland High School, Eastland
Gorman High School, Gorman
Ranger High School, Ranger
Rising Star High School, Rising Star

Ector County

Odessa

Odessa High School
Permian High School
Premier Charter School - Odessa

Edwards County

Nueces Canyon High School, Barksdale
Rocksprings High School, Rocksprings

El Paso County

Anthony High School, Anthony
Canutillo High School, Canutillo
San Elizario High School, San Elizario
Tornillo High School, Tornillo

Clint

Clint High School
Horizon High School
Mountain View High School

El Paso

Public Schools

Americas High School
Andress High School
Austin High School
Bel Air High School
Bowie High School
Burges High School
Chapin High School
College Career & Tech Academy
Coronado High School
Del Valle High School
Eastlake High School
Eastwood High School
El Dorado High School
El Paso High School
Franklin High School
Hanks High School
Irvin High School
Jefferson High School
Montwood High School
Parkland High School
Pebble Hills High School
Riverside High School
Socorro High School
Silva Health Magnet High School
Transmountain Early College High School
Ysleta High School

Charter/Private Schools

Cathedral High School
César Chávez Academy
El Paso Academy East/West
Father Yermo High School
Founders Classical Academy - El Paso
Harmony Science Academy/Harmony School of Innovation - El Paso
KEYS Academy
Loretto Academy
Lydia Patterson Institute
Plato Academy
Premier Charter School (Eastpointe, Mesa)
 Radford School
Triumph School (East, West)

Fabens

Cotton Valley Early College High School
Fabens High School

Ellis County

Avalon High School, Avalon
Ennis High School, Ennis
Ferris High School, Ferris
Italy High School, Italy
Maypearl High School, Maypearl
Milford High School, Milford
Ovilla Christian School, Ovilla
Palmer High School, Palmer
Red Oak High School, Red Oak

Midlothian

Midlothian High School
Midlothian Heritage High School

Waxahachie

Waxahachie High School
Waxahachie Global High School
Life School - Waxahachie

Erath County

Dublin High School, Dublin
Huckabay High School, Huckabay
Lingleville High School, Lingleville
Stephenville High School, Stephenville

Falls County

Chilton High School, Chilton
Marlin High School, Marlin
Rosebud-Lott High School, Rosebud

Fannin County

Bonham High School, Bonham
Dodd City High School, Dodd City
Ector High School, Ector
Fannindel High School, Ladonia
Honey Grove High School, Honey Grove
Leonard High School, Leonard
Sam Rayburn High School, Ivanhoe
Savoy High School, Savoy
Trenton High School, Trenton

Fayette County

Fayetteville High School, Fayetteville
Flatonia Secondary School, Flatonia
La Grange High School, La Grange
Round Top-Carmine High School, Carmine
Schulenburg High School, Schulenburg

Fisher County

Roby High School, Roby
Rotan High School, Rotan

Floyd County

Floydada High School, Floydada
Lockney High School, Lockney

Foard County
Crowell High School, Crowell

Fort Bend County

Needville High School, Needville
Stafford High School, Stafford
Willowridge High School, Houston

Fulshear

Fulshear High School
Jordan High School

Missouri City

Elkins High School
Hightower High School
Marshall High School

Richmond

Foster High School
International Leadership Academy of Texas - Katy-Westpark
Randle High School

Rosenberg

Lamar Consolidated High School
Terry High School

Sugar Land

Clements High School
Dulles High School
Fort Bend Christian Academy
Harmony School of Innovation - Sugar Land
Kempner High School

Unincorporated Fort Bend County

Austin High School
Bush High School
Cinco Ranch High School
George Ranch High School
Ridge Point High School
Seven Lakes High School
Travis High School
Tompkins High School

Franklin County
Mount Vernon High School, Mount Vernon

Freestone County

Fairfield High School, Fairfield
Teague High School, Teague
Wortham High School, Wortham

Frio County

Dilley High School, Dilley
Pearsall High School, Pearsall

Gaines County

Loop High School, Loop
Seagraves High School, Seagraves
Seminole High School, Seminole

Galveston County

Clear Lake High School, Houston
Clear View High School Webster
Dickinson High School, Dickinson
High Island High School, High Island
Hitchcock High School, Hitchcock
La Marque High School, La Marque
Santa Fe High School, Santa Fe
Texas City High School, Texas City

Friendswood

Clear Brook High School
Friendswood High School

Galveston

Ball High School
O'Connell College Preparatory School

League City

Bay Area Christian School
Clear Creek High School
Clear Falls High School
Clear Path Alternative School
Clear Springs High School

Garza County

Post High School, Post
Southland High School, Southland

Gillespie County

Fredericksburg High School, Fredericksburg
Harper High School, Harper

Glasscock County
Garden City High School, Garden City

Goliad County
Goliad High School, Goliad

Gonzales County

Gonzales High School, Gonzales
Nixon-Smiley High School, Nixon
Waelder High School, Waelder

Gray County

Lefors High School, Lefors
McLean High School, McLean
Pampa High School, Pampa

Grayson County

Bells High School, Bells
Collinsville High School, Collinsville
Denison High School, Denison
Gunter High School, Gunter
Howe High School, Howe
Pottsboro High School, Pottsboro
S&S Consolidated High School, Sadler
Sherman High School, Sherman, Texas
Tom Bean High School, Tom Bean
Van Alstyne High School, Van Alstyne
Whitesboro High School, Whitesboro
Whitewright High School, Whitewright

Gregg County

Kilgore High School, Kilgore
White Oak High School, White Oak

Longview

East Texas Charter High School
Longview High School
Pine Tree High School
Premier Charter School - Longview
Spring Hill High School
 Trinity School of Texas

Gladewater

Gladewater High School
Sabine High School

Grimes County

Anderson-Shiro High School, Anderson
Iola High School, Iola
Navasota High School, Navasota
Richards High School, Richards

Guadalupe County

Marion High School, Marion
Navarro High School, Geronimo
Steele High School, Cibolo

Schertz

Samuel Clemens High School
Allison Steele Enrichment Center

Seguin

Lifegate Christian School
Seguin High School

Hale County

Abernathy High School, Abernathy
Cotton Center High School, Cotton Center
Hale Center High School, Hale Center
Petersburg High School, Petersburg
Plainview High School, Plainview

Hall County

Memphis High School, Memphis
Valley High School, Turkey

Hamilton County

Jonesboro High School, Jonesboro
Hamilton High School, Hamilton
Hico High School, Hico

Hansford County

Gruver High School, Gruver
Spearman High School, Spearman

Hardeman County

Chillicothe High School, Chillicothe
Quanah High School, Quanah

Hardin County

Hardin-Jefferson High School, Sour Lake
Kountze High School, Kountze
Lumberton High School, Lumberton
Silsbee High School, Silsbee
West Hardin High School, Saratoga

Harris County

Channelview High School/Kolarik 9th Grade Center, Channelview
The Chinquapin School, Highlands
Clear Brook High School, Friendswood
Crosby High School, Crosby
Deer Park High School, Deer Park
Galena Park High School, Galena Park
Hargrave High School, Huffman
Humble High School, Humble
Jersey Village High School, Jersey Village
The Kinkaid School, Piney Point Village
Klein High School, Klein
La Porte High School, La Porte
Memorial High School, Hedwig Village
Northeast Christian Academy, Kingwood
South Houston High School, South Houston

Baytown

Baytown Christian Academy
Goose Creek Memorial High School
Lee High School
Sterling High School

Bellaire

Bellaire High School
Episcopal High School

Cypress

 Covenant Academy
Cypress Park High School
Cypress Ranch High School
Cypress Springs High School
Cypress Woods High School

Houston

Public Schools

Aldine High School
Alief Elsik High School
Alief Hastings High School
Alief Kerr High School
Alief Taylor High School
Austin High School
Blanson Career/Tech High School
Carnegie Vanguard High School
Carver High School for Applied Technology
Challenge Early College High School
Chávez High School
Clear Lake High School
Davis High School
DeBakey High School for Health Professions
Dobie High School
East Early College High School
Eastwood Academy
Eisenhower High School
Energy Institute High School
Forest Brook High School
Furr High School
Heights High School
High School for Law and Justice
Houston Academy for International Studies
Jordan Career Center
Kashmere High School
Kinder Performing/Visual Arts High School
Kingwood High School
Kingwood Park High School
Lamar High School
Liberty Alternative High School
MacArthur High School
Madison High School
Milby High School
Nimitz High School
North Forest High School
North Houston Early College High School
North Shore Senior High School
Northbrook High School
Northside High School
Rogers Alternative School
Sam Houston High School
Scarborough High School
Sharpstown High School
Smiley High School
South Early College High School
Spring Woods High School
Sterling High School
Stratford High School
Victory Early College High School
Waltrip High School
Washington High School
Westbury High School
Westchester Academy for International Studies
Westside High School
Wheatley High School
Wisdom High School
Worthing High School
Yates High School

Charter Schools

Beta Academy 
Harmony Public Schools (Advancement, Discovery, Ingenuity, Science Academy)
Houston Heights High School 
International Leadership Academy of Texas - Windmill Lakes-Orem
KIPP Texas Public Schools (Connect, East End, Generations, Northeast, Sunnyside)
Premier Charter School (Champions, Gallery, Hobby, Sharpstown)
Pro-Vision Academy
Sanchez Charter Schools (East End, Northside)
Ser-Niños High School
Texans Can Academy (Hobby, North, Southwest)
YES Prep Public Schools (Bray Oaks, East End, Eisenhower, Fifth Ward, Gulfton, North Central, North Forest, Northbrook, Northside, Southeast, Southside, Southwest, West, White Oak)
Yzaguirre School for Success

Private Schools

Al-Hadi School of Accelerative Learning
Archway Academy
Awty International School
Beren Academy
British International School of Houston
The Covenant Preparatory School
Cristo Rey Jesuit College Preparatory of Houston
Duchesne Academy
The Emery/Weiner School
Houston Christian High School
Houston Heights High School
Iman Academy
Incarnate Word Academy
Islamic Education Institute of Texas
Lutheran High School North
Lutheran South Academy
Mount Carmel High School
Northland Christian School
The Oaks Adventist Christian School
Saint Agnes Academy
St. John's School
St. Pius X High School
St. Thomas' Episcopal School
St. Thomas High School
School of the Woods
Second Baptist School
Strake Jesuit College Preparatory 
St. Stephen's Episcopal School Houston
The Village School
Westbury Christian School
Xavier Educational Academy

Katy

Aristoi Classical Academy
Calvin Nelms Charter High School
Harmony School of Innovation - Katy
Katy High School
Mirus Academy
Pope John XXIII High School

League City

Clear Creek High School
Clear Falls High School
Clear Springs High School

Pasadena

Pasadena High School
Pasadena Memorial High School
Rayburn High School

Tomball

Concordia Lutheran High School
Tomball High School
Tomball Memorial High

Unincorporated Harris County

Public

Atascocita High School
Bridgeland High School
Cy-Fair High School
Cypress Creek High School
Cypress Falls High School
Cypress Lakes High School
Cypress Ridge High School
Dekaney High School
King High School
Klein Collins High School
Klein Forest High School
Klein Oak High School
Langham Creek High School
Mayde Creek High School
Morton Ranch High School
Paetow High School
Quest High School
Spring High School
Summer Creek High School
Taylor High School
Westfield High School
Windfern High School
Wunsche High School

Private

Cypress Christian School
Faith West Academy
Family Christian Academy
Rosehill Christian School

Harrison County

Elysian Fields High School, Elysian Fields
Hallsville High School, Hallsville
Harleton High School, Harleton
Marshall High School, Marshall
Waskom High School, Waskom

Hartley County

Channing High School, Channing
Hartley High School, Hartley

Haskell County
Rule High School, Rule

Haskell

Haskell High School, Haskell
Paint Creek High School, Haskell

Hays County

Dripping Springs High School, Dripping Springs
Hays High School, Buda

Kyle

Lehman High School
Valor Academy - Kyle

San Marcos

Ki Charter Academy
San Marcos Baptist Academy
San Marcos High School

Wimberley

Katherine Anne Porter Charter High School
Wimberley High School

Hemphill County
Canadian High School, Canadian

Henderson County

Athens High School, Athens
Brownsboro High School, Brownsboro
Cross Roads High School, Cross Roads
Eustace High School, Eustace
LaPoynor High School, Larue
Malakoff High School, Malakoff
Trinidad High School, Trinidad

Hidalgo County

Edcouch-Elsa High School, Edcouch
Hidalgo High School, Hidalgo
La Villa High School, La Villa
Monte Alto High School, Monte Alto
Premier Charter School - Palmview, Palmview
Progreso High School, Progreso

Alamo

Pharr-San Juan-Alamo Memorial High School
Valley Christian Heritage School
Vanguard Charter Academy - Mozart

Donna

IDEA Schools - Donna
Donna High School

San Juan

IDEA Schools - San Juan
Pharr-San Juan-Alamo North High School
Premier Charter School - San Juan

Edinburg

Economedes High School
Edinburg High School
Edinburg North High School
IDEA Schools (Edinburg, Quest, Toros)
Premier Charter School - Edinburg Career/Tech Center
South Texas Business, Education & Technology Academy
Vanguard Charter Academy - Beethoven
Vela High School

La Joya

Juarez-Lincoln High School
La Joya High School

McAllen

Achieve Early College High School
IDEA Schools (McAllen, Tres Lagos)
Lamar Academy
McAllen High School
McAllen Memorial High School
Rowe High School
Triumph School - McAllen

Mercedes

Mercedes High School
The Science Academy of South Texas (SciTech)
South Texas High School for Health Professions (Med High)
Triumph School Mercedes

Mission

IDEA Schools (Mission, North Mission)
Mission High School
Palmview High School
Premier Charter School - Mission
Sharyland High School
Veterans Memorial High School

Pharr

IDEA Schools - Pharr
Jefferson T-Stem Early College High Schoool
Pharr-San Juan-Alamo High School
Pharr-San Juan-Alamo Southwest High School 
Valley View High School
Vanguard Charter Academy - Rembrandt

Weslaco

IDEA Schools (Alamo, Weslaco, Weslaco Pike)
Premier Charter School - Weslaco
South Palm Gardens High School
Weslaco Alternative School
Weslaco High School
Weslaco East High School

Hill County

Abbott High School, Abbott
Aquilla High School, Aquilla
Blum High School, Blum
Bynum High School, Bynum
Covington High School, Covington
Hillsboro High School, Hillsboro
Hubbard High School, Hubbard
Itasca High School, Itasca
Mt. Calm High School, Mt Calm
Penelope High School, Penelope
Whitney High School, Whitney

Hockley County

Anton High School, Anton
Levelland High School, Levelland
Ropes High School, Ropesville
Smyer High School, Smyer
Sundown High School, Sundown
Whitharral High School, Whitharral

Hood County

Lipan High School, Lipan
Tolar High School, Tolar

Granbury

 Cornerstone Christian Academy
Granbury High School
Lone Star Success Academy
 North Central Texas Academy
Premier Charter School - Granbury

Hopkins County

Cumby High School, Cumby
Como-Pickton High School, Pickton
Miller Grove High School, Miller Grove
Saltillo High School, Saltillo
Sulphur Bluff High School, Sulphur Bluff

Sulphur Springs

North Hopkins High School
Sulphur Springs High School

Houston County

Crockett High School, Crockett
Grapeland High School, Grapeland
Kennard High School, Kennard
Latexo High School, Latexo
Lovelady High School, Lovelady

Howard County

Big Spring High School, Big Spring
Coahoma High School, Coahoma
Forsan High School, Forsan

Hudspeth County

Dell City High School, Dell City
Fort Hancock High School, Fort Hancock
Sierra Blanca High School, Sierra Blanca

Hunt County

Bland High School, Merit
Boles High School, Quinlan
Caddo Mills High School, Caddo Mills
Campbell High School, Campbell
Celeste High School, Celeste
Commerce High School, Commerce
Ford High School, Quinlan
Greenville High School, Greenville
Lone Oak High School, Lone Oak
Wolfe City High School, Wolfe City

Hutchinson County

Borger High School, Borger
Sanford-Fritch High School, Fritch
West Texas High School, Stinnett

Irion County
Irion County High School, Mertzon

Jack County

Bryson High School, Bryson
Jacksboro High School, Jacksboro
Perrin-Whitt High School, Perrin

Jackson County

Edna High School, Edna
Ganado High School, Ganado
Industrial High School, Vanderbilt

Jasper County

Brookeland High School, Brookeland
Buna High School, Buna
Evadale High School, Evadale
Jasper High School, Jasper
Kirbyville High School, Kirbyville

Jeff Davis County

Fort Davis High School, Fort Davis
Valentine High School, Valentine

Jefferson County

Hamshire-Fannett High School, Hamshire
Nederland High School, Nederland
Port Neches–Groves High School, Port Neches
Sabine Pass High School, Sabine Pass

Port Arthur

Bob Hope High School
Memorial High School

Beaumont

Central Medical Magnet High School
Evolution Academy Beaumont
Harmony Science Academy - Beaumont
Legacy Christian Academy
Monsignor Kelly Catholic High School
Ozen High School
Richard Milburn Academy
Texas Academy for Leadership in the Humanities
West Brook Senior High School

Jim Hogg County
Hebbronville High School, Hebbronville

Jim Wells County

Ben Bolt-Palito Blanco High School, Ben Bolt
Orange Grove High School, Orange Grove
Premont High School, Premont

Alice

Alice High School
Alice Christian School

Johnson County

Alvarado High School, Alvarado
Cleburne High School, Cleburne
Godley High School, Godley
Grandview High School, Grandview
Joshua High School, Joshua
Rio Vista High School, Rio Vista
Venus High School, Venus

Burleson

Burleson High School
Burleson Centennial High School

Keene

Chisholm Trail Academy
Wanda R. Smith High School

Jones County

Anson High School, Anson
Hamlin High School, Hamlin
Hawley High School, Hawley
Lueders-Avoca High School, Lueders
Stamford High School, Stamford

Karnes County

Falls City High School, Falls City
Karnes City High School, Karnes City
Kenedy High School, Kenedy
Runge High School, Runge

Kaufman County

Crandall High School, Crandall
Kaufman High School, Kaufman
Kemp High School, Kemp
Mabank High School, Mabank
Scurry-Rosser High School, Scurry
Terrell High School, Terrell

Forney

Forney High School
North Forney High School

Kendall County
Comfort High School, Comfort

Boerne

Boerne High School
Champion High School
 Geneva School of Boerne

Kerr County

Center Point High School, Center Point
Tom Moore High School, Ingram

Kerrville

Our Lady of the Hills High School
Tivy High School

Kent County
Jayton High School, Jayton

Kimble County
Junction High School, Junction

King County
Guthrie High School, Guthrie

Kinney County
Brackett High School, Brackettville

Kleberg County
Kaufer High School, Riviera

Kingsville

Academy High School
Jubilee Charter Academy - Kingsville
King High School
Presbyterian Pan American School

Knox County

Benjamin High School, Benjamin
Knox City High School, Knox City
Munday High School, Munday

La Salle County
Cotulla High School, Cotulla

Lamar County
Prairiland High School, Pattonville

Paris

Chisum High School
North Lamar High School
Paris High School
Christian Academy

Lamb County

Amherst High School, Amherst
Littlefield High School, Littlefield
Olton High School, Olton
Springlake-Earth High School, Earth
Sudan High School, Sudan

Lampasas County

Lampasas High School, Lampasas
Lometa High School, Lometa

Lavaca County
Moulton High School, Moulton

Hallettsville

Hallettsville High School
Sacred Heart High School

Shiner

Shiner Catholic School
Shiner High School

Lee County

Dime Box High School, Dime Box
Giddings High School, Giddings
Lexington High School, Lexington

Leon County

Buffalo High School, Buffalo
Centerville Junior-Senior High School, Centerville
Leon High School, Jewett
Normangee High School, Normangee
Oakwood High School, Oakwood

Liberty County

Hardin High School, Hardin
Hull-Daisetta High School, Daisetta
Liberty High School, Liberty

Dayton

Dayton High School
Premier Charter School - Dayton

Cleveland

Cleveland High School
International Leadership Academy of Texas - Liberty
Tarkington High School

Limestone County

Coolidge High School, Coolidge
Groesbeck High School, Groesbeck
Mexia High School, Mexia

Lipscomb County

Booker High School, Booker
Darrouzett High School, Darrouzett
Follett High School, Follett
Higgins High School, Higgins

Live Oak County

George West High School, George West
Three Rivers High School, Three Rivers

Llano County

Kingsland School, Kingsland
Llano High School, Llano

Lubbock County

Frenship High School, Wolfforth
Idalou High School, Idalou
New Deal High School, New Deal
Shallowater High School, Shallowater
Slaton High School, Slaton

Lubbock

Christ the King High School
Cooper High School
Coronado High School
Estacado High School
Lubbock Christian High School
Lubbock High School
Monterey High School
Premier Charter School (Briercroft, Lubbock)
Roosevelt High School
Trinity Christian High School
Triumph School Lubbock

Lynn County

New Home High School, New Home
O'Donnell High School, O'Donnell
Tahoka High School, Tahoka
Wilson High School, Wilson

Madison County

Madisonville High School, Madisonville
North Zulch High School, North Zulch

Marion County

Jefferson

Jefferson Christian Academy
Jefferson High School

Martin County

Grady High School, Lenorah
Stanton High School, Stanton

Mason County
Mason High School, Mason

Matagorda County

Bay City High School, Bay City
Palacios High School, Palacios
Tidehaven High School, El Maton
Van Vleck High School, Van Vleck

Maverick County

Eagle Pass

Eagle Pass High School
Winn High School

McCulloch County

Brady High School, Brady
Lohn High School, Lohn
Rochelle High School, Rochelle

McLennan County

Axtell High School, Axtell
Bosqueville High School, Bosqueville
Bruceville-Eddy High School, Eddy
China Spring High School, China Spring
Crawford High School, Crawford
Gholson High School, Gholson
Lorena High School, Lorena
Mart High School, Mart
McGregor High School, McGregor
Moody High School, Moody
Riesel High School, Riesel
Robinson High School, Robinson
West High School, West

Waco

Connally High School
Eagle Christian Academy
Harmony School of Innovation - Waco
La Vega High School
 Live Oak Classical School
Midway High School
Premier Charter School - Waco
Rapoport Academy Charter School
Reicher Catholic High School
University High School
Vanguard College Preparatory School
Waco High School

McMullen County
McMullen County High School, Tilden

Medina County

D'Hanis High School, D'Hanis
Devine High School, Devine
Hondo High School, Hondo
Medina Valley High School, Castroville
Natalia High School, Natalia

Menard County
Menard High School, Menard

Midland County

Midland

Coleman Alternative High School
Greenwood High School
Legacy High School
Midland Christian High School
Midland High School
Premier High School of Midland
Texas Leadership Charter Academy - Midland
Trinity High School of Midland

Milam County

Buckholts High School, Buckholts
Milano High School, Milano
Rockdale High School, Rockdale
Thorndale High School, Thorndale
Yoe High School, Cameron

Mills County

Goldthwaite High School, Goldthwaite
Mullin High School, Mullin
Priddy High School, Priddy

Mitchell County

Colorado High School, Colorado City
Loraine High School, Loraine
Westbrook High School, Westbrook

Montague County

Bowie High School, Bowie
Forestburg High School, Forestburg
Gold-Burg High School, Stoneburg
Saint Jo High School, Saint Jo

Nocona

Nocona High School
Prairie Valley High School

Montgomery County
Splendora High School, Splendora

Willis

Trinity Charter Schools - Willis
Willis High School

Conroe

Caney Creek High School
Conroe High School
Covenant Christian School
Oak Ridge High School

Magnolia

Magnolia High School
Magnolia West High School

Montgomery

Lake Creek High School
Montgomery High School

New Caney

New Caney High School
Porter High School

Spring

Evolution Academy Spring
Frassati Catholic High School
Grand Oaks High School

The Woodlands

Conroe ISD Academy of Science and Technology
 Cunae International School
The John Cooper School
The Woodlands Christian Academy
The Woodlands High School
The Woodlands College Park High School

Moore County

Dumas High School, Dumas
Sunray High School, Sunray

Morris County

Daingerfield High School, Daingerfield
Pewitt High School, Omaha

Motley County
Motley County High School, Matador

Nacogdoches County

Central Heights High School, Central Heights
Chireno High School, Chireno
Cushing High School, Cushing
Douglass High School, Douglass
Garrison High School, Garrison
Martinsville High School, Martinsville
Nacogdoches High School, Nacogdoches
Woden High School, Woden

Navarro County

Blooming Grove High School, Blooming Grove
Corsicana High School, Corsicana
Dawson High School, Dawson
Frost High School, Frost
Kerens High School, Kerens
Mildred High School, Corsicana
Rice High School, Rice

Newton County

Burkeville Junior-Senior High School, Burkeville
Deweyville High School, Deweyville
Newton High School, Newton

Nolan County

Blackwell High School, Blackwell
Sweetwater High School, Sweetwater

Roscoe

Highland High School
Roscoe Collegiate High School

Nueces County

Agua Dulce High School, Agua Dulce
Banquete High School, Banquete
Bishop High School, Bishop
Port Aransas High School, Port Aransas
Robstown High School, Robstown

Corpus Christi

Public Schools

Calallen High School
Carroll High School
Flour Bluff High School
King High School
London High School
Miller High School
Moody High School
Ray High School
Tuloso-Midway High School
Veterans Memorial High School
West Oso High School

Charter/Private Schools

Annapolis Christian Academy
Incarnate Word Academy
John Paul II High School
Por Vida Academy - Corpus Christi
Premier Charter School - Corpus Christi 
Richard Milburn Academy
School of Science and Technology
Trinity Charter Schools - Corpus Christi

Ochiltree County
Perryton High School, Perryton

Oldham County

Adrian High School, Adrian
Boys Ranch High School, Boys Ranch
Vega High School, Vega

Orange County

Bridge City High School, Bridge City
Little Cypress-Mauriceville High School, Orange
Orangefield High School, Orangefield
Vidor High School, Vidor
West Orange-Stark High School, West Orange

Palo Pinto County

Gordon High School, Gordon
Graford High School, Graford
Mineral Wells High School, Mineral Wells
Santo High School, Santo
Strawn High School, Strawn

Panola County

Beckville Junior-Senior High School, Beckville
Gary High School, Gary

Carthage

Carthage High School
Panola Schools (Charter, Early College)

Parker County

Aledo High School, Aledo
Brock High School, Brock
Millsap High School, Millsap
Peaster High School, Peaster
Poolville High School, Poolville
Springtown High School, Springtown
Weatherford High School, Weatherford

Parmer County

Bovina High School, Bovina
Farwell High School, Farwell
Friona High School, Friona
Lazbuddie High School, Lazbuddie

Pecos County

Buena Vista High School, Imperial
Fort Stockton High School, Fort Stockton
Iraan High School, Iraan

Polk County

Big Sandy High School, Dallardsville
Corrigan-Camden High School, Corrigan
Goodrich High School, Goodrich
Leggett High School, Leggett
Livingston High School, Livingston
Onalaska High School, Onalaska

Potter County
Bushland High School, Bushland

Amarillo

Highland Park High School
Holy Cross Catholic Academy
Palo Duro High School
Premier Charter School - Amarillo
River Road High School
San Jacinto Christian Academy
Tascosa High School

Presidio County

Marfa High School, Marfa
Presidio High School, Presidio

Rains County
Rains High School, Emory

Randall County

Amarillo

Amarillo High School
Ascension Academy
Caprock High School
Randall High School

Canyon

Canyon High School
Premier Charter School - Canyon

Reagan County
Reagan County High School, Big Lake

Real County
Leakey High School, Leakey

Red River County

Avery High School, Avery
Clarksville High School, Clarksville
Detroit High School, Detroit
Rivercrest High School, Bogata

Reeves County

Balmorhea High School, Balmorhea
Pecos High School, Pecos

Refugio County

Austwell-Tivoli High School, Tivoli
Refugio High School, Refugio
Woodsboro High School, Woodsboro

Roberts County
Miami High School, Miami

Robertson County

Bremond High School, Bremond
Calvert High School, Calvert
Franklin High School, Franklin
Hearne High School, Hearne
Mumford High School, Mumford

Rockwall County

Rockwall-Heath High School, Heath
Royse City High School, Royse City

Rockwall

Heritage Christian Academy
Rockwall High School

Runnels County

Ballinger High School, Ballinger
Miles High School, Miles
Winters High School, Winters

Rusk County

Carlisle High School, Price
Henderson High School, Henderson
Laneville High School, Laneville
Leverett's Chapel High School, Laird Hill
Mount Enterprise High School, Mount Enterprise
Overton High School, Overton
Tatum High School, Tatum
West Rusk High School, New London

Sabine County

Hemphill High School, Hemphill
West Sabine High School, Pineland

San Augustine County

Broaddus High School, Broaddus
San Augustine High School, San Augustine

San Jacinto County

Coldspring-Oakhurst High School, Coldspring
Shepherd High School, Shepherd

San Patricio County

Aransas Pass High School, Aransas Pass
Gregory-Portland High School, Portland
Ingleside High School, Ingleside
Mathis High School, Mathis
Odem High School, Odem
Sinton High School, Sinton
Taft High School, Taft

San Saba County

Cherokee High School, Cherokee
Richland Springs High School, Richland Springs
San Saba High School, San Saba

Schleicher County
Eldorado High School, Eldorado

Scurry County

Hermleigh High School, Hermleigh
Ira High School, Ira
Snyder High School, Snyder

Shackelford County

Albany Junior-Senior High School, Albany
Moran High School, Moran

Shelby County

Center High School, Center
Joaquin High School, Joaquin
Shelbyville High School, Shelbyville
Tenaha High School, Tenaha
Timpson High School, Timpson

Sherman County
Stratford High School, Stratford

Smith County

Arp High School, Arp
Lindale High School, Lindale
Troup High School, Troup
Whitehouse High School, Whitehouse
Winona High School, Winona

Bullard

Brook Hill School
Bullard High School

Tyler

All Saints Episcopal School
Bishop Gorman High School
Chapel Hill High School
Christian Heritage School
Founders Classical Academy - Tyler
Grace Community School
Harvest Time Christian Academy
King's Academy Christian School
Lee High School
Premier Charter School - Tyler
Trinity Charter Schools - Tyler
Tyler High School

Somervell County

Glen Rose High School, Glen Rose
Brazos River Charter School, Nemo

Starr County

Roma High School, Roma
San Isidro High School, San Isidro

Rio Grande City

Grulla High School
IDEA Schools - Rio Grande City
Prep for Early College High School
Rio Grande City High School

Stephens County
Breckenridge High School, Breckenridge

Sterling County
Sterling City High School, Sterling City

Stonewall County
Aspermont High School, Aspermont

Sutton County
Sonora High School, Sonora

Swisher County

Happy High School, Happy
Kress High School, Kress
Tulia High School, Tulia

Tarrant County

Azle High School, Azle
Bell High School, Hurst
Crowley High School, Crowley
Everman High School, Everman
Haltom High School, Haltom City
Keller High School, Keller
Kennedale High School, Kennedale
Lake Worth High School, Lake Worth
Pantego Christian Academy, Pantego
Saginaw High School (Texas), Saginaw
Trinity Prep, Watauga
Western Hills High School, Benbrook

Arlington

Public Schools

Arlington High School
Bowie High School
Lamar High School
Mansfield Timberview High School
Martin High School
Sam Houston High School
Seguin High School

Charter/Private Schools

Burton Adventist Academy
Gateway School
Grace Preparatory Academy
Newman International Academy (Arlington, Grace)
 The Oakridge School
Premier Charter School - Arlington
St. Paul's Preparatory Academy
Uplift Schools - Summit International Prep
Texas Leadership Charter Academy - Arlington

Colleyville

Colleyville Heritage High School
Covenant Christian Academy

Euless

Harmony Science Academy - Euless
Treetops School International
Trinity High School

Fort Worth

Public Schools

Arlington Heights High School
Boswell High School
Brewer High School
Carter-Riverside High School
Castleberry High School
Chisholm Trail High School
Diamond Hill-Jarvis High School
Dunbar High School
Eastern Hills High School
Fossil Ridge High School
Keller Central High School
Marine Creek Collegiate School
North Crowley High School
North Side High School
Paschal High School
Polytechnic High School
South Hills High School
Southwest High School
TCC South Collegiate High School
Terrell STEM/VPA Academy
Timber Creek High School
Trimble Technical High School
World Languages Institute
Wyatt High School
Young Men's Leadership Academy
Young Women's Leadership Academy

Charter/Private Schools

All Saints' Episcopal School
Bethesda Christian School
Cassata Catholic High School
Covenant Classical School
Cristo Rey Fort Worth College Prep
Fort Worth Country Day School
Harmony School of Innovation - Fort Worth
International Leadership Academy of Texas - Keller-Saginaw
Trinity Valley School
Lake Country Christian School
Nolan Catholic High School
Premier Charter School (Fort Worth, Jacksboro, Southside)
Southwest Christian High School
Temple Christian School
Texans Can Academy (Lancaster, West Creek)
Trinity Baptist Temple Academy
Trinity Charter Schools (East Seminary, Fort Worth)
Uplift Schools - Mighty Prep

Grapevine

Grapevine Faith Christian School
Grapevine High School

Mansfield

Mansfield High School
Mansfield Lake Ridge High School
Mansfield Legacy High School
Mansfield Summit High School

North Richland Hills

Birdville High School
 E. A. Young Academy
Fort Worth Christian School
Richland High School
Winfree Academy North Richland Hills

Southlake

Carroll High School
 The Clariden School

Taylor County

Merkel High School, Merkel
Trent High School, Trent
Jim Ned High School, Tuscola

Abilene

Abilene Christian School
Abilene High School
Academy of Technology, Engineering, Mathematics, and Science
Cooper High School
Holland Medical High School
Premier Charter School - Abilene
Wylie High School

Terrell County
Sanderson High School, Sanderson

Terry County

Brownfield High School, Brownfield
Meadow High School, Meadow
Wellman-Union High School, Wellman

Throckmorton County

Throckmorton High School, Throckmorton
Woodson High School, Woodson

Titus County

Mount Pleasant

Chapel Hill High School
Mount Pleasant High School

Tom Green County

Christoval High School, Christoval
Grape Creek High School, Grape Creek
Veribest High School, Veribest
Wall High School, Wall
Water Valley High School, Water Valley

San Angelo

Central High School
Lake View High School
Premier Charter School (Ingram, San Angelo, Windcrest)
Texas Leadership Charter Academy - San Angelo

Travis County

Del Valle High School, Del Valle
Lago Vista High School, Lago Vista

Austin

Public Schools

Akins High School
Anderson High School
Austin High School
Bowie High School
Crockett High School
Eastside Memorial High School
Garza High School
Johnson High School/Liberal Arts/Science Academy
Lake Travis High School
Lanier High School
McCallum High School
McNeil High School
Reagan High School
Travis High School
Vandegrift High School
Westlake High School
Westwood High School

Charter Schools

Austin Achieve High School
Chaparral Star Academy
Harmony School of Excellence - Austin
IDEA Schools (Bluff Springs, Montopolis, Parmer Park, Rundberg)
Jubilee Charter Academy - Austin
KIPP Austin Schools (Brave, Collegiate)
NYOS Charter School
Premier Charter School (South, Wells)
Texans Can Academy - Austin
Valor Academy (North, South)
Wayside Sci-Tech High School

Private Schools

Austin Peace Academy
Brentwood Christian School
The Griffin School
Headwaters School
Hill Country Christian School
Huntington-Surrey High School
Hyde Park Baptist High School
Kirby Hall School
Regents School of Austin
St. Andrew's Episcopal School
St. Dominic Savio Catholic High School
St. Michael's Academy
St. Stephen's Episcopal School
San Juan Diego Catholic High School
Veritas Academy

Cedar Park

Cedar Park High School
Summit Christian Academy

Manor

Manor Early College High School
Manor Excel Academy
Manor High School
Manor New Tech High School

Pflugerville

Concordia Academy
Connally High School
Harmony Science Academy - Pflugerville
Hendrickson High School
PACE Alternative High School
Pflugerville High School
Weiss High School
Premier Charter School - Pflugerville

Trinity County

Apple Springs High School, Apple Springs
Centerville High School, Groveton
Groveton Junior/Senior High School, Groveton
Trinity High School, Trinity

Tyler County

Chester High School, Chester
Colmesneil High School, Colmesneil
Spurger High School, Spurger
Warren High School, Warren
Woodville High School, Woodville

Upshur County

Gilmer High School, Gilmer
Gladewater High School, Gladewater
New Diana High School, Diana
Ore City High School, Ore City
Union Grove High School, Union Grove
Union Hill High School, Union Hill

Big Sandy

Big Sandy High School
Harmony High School

Upton County

McCamey High School, McCamey
Rankin High School, Rankin

Uvalde County

Knippa High School, Knippa
Sabinal High School, Sabinal
Utopia High School, Utopia
Uvalde High School, Uvalde

Val Verde County
Comstock High School, Comstock

Del Rio

Del Rio High School
Premier Charter School - Del Rio

Van Zandt County

Canton High School, Canton
Edgewood High School, Edgewood
Fruitvale High School, Fruitvale
Grand Saline High School, Grand Saline
Martin's Mill High School, Martins Mill
Van High School, Van
Wills Point High School, Wills Point

Victoria County
Bloomington High School, Bloomington

Victoria

Memorial High School
St. Joseph High School
Victoria East High School
Victoria West High School

Walker County

Huntsville

Alpha Omega Academy
Huntsville High School (Texas)
Premier Charter School - Huntsville

New Waverly

New Waverly High School
Raven School

Waller County

Hempstead High School, Hempstead
Royal High School, Brookshire
Waller High School, Waller

Ward County

Grandfalls-Royalty High School, Grandfalls
Monahans High School, Monahans

Washington County
Burton High School, Burton

Brenham

Brenham High School
Citadel Christian School
Trinity Charter Schools - Brenham

Webb County
Bruni High School, Bruni

Laredo

Alexander High School
Cigarroa High School
Gateway Academy
Harmony School of Excellence - Laredo
Johnson High School
Martin High School
Nixon High School
Premier Charter School - Laredo
Triumph School - Laredo
United High School
United South High School

Wharton County

Boling High School, Boling
East Bernard High School, East Bernard
El Campo High School, El Campo
Louise High School, Louise
Wharton High School, Wharton

Wheeler County

Fort Elliott High School, Briscoe
Kelton High School, Kelton
Shamrock High School, Shamrock
Wheeler High School, Wheeler

Wichita County

Burkburnett High School, Burkburnett
Electra High School, Electra
Iowa Park High School, Iowa Park

Wichita Falls

Christ Academy
City View Junior/Senior High School
Hirschi High School
Notre Dame High School
Premier Charter School - Wichita Falls
Rider High School
Wichita Christian School
Wichita Falls High School

Wilbarger County

Harrold High School, Harrold
Northside High School, Fargo
Vernon High School, Vernon

Willacy County

Lyford High School, Lyford
Raymondville High School, Raymondville
San Perlita High School, San Perlita

Williamson County

Florence High School, Florence
Granger High School, Granger
Hutto High School, Hutto
Jarrell High School, Jarrell
Liberty Hill High School, Liberty Hill
Thrall High School, Thrall

Cedar Park

Cedar Park High School
Vista Ridge High School

Georgetown

Chip Richarte High School
East View High School
Georgetown High School

Leander

Founders Classical Academy - Leander
Glenn High School
Leander High School
Rouse High School

Round Rock

Cedar Ridge High School
Round Rock Christian Academy
Round Rock High School
Stony Point High School

Taylor

St. Mary's Catholic School
Taylor High School

Wilson County

Floresville High School, Floresville
La Vernia High School, La Vernia
Poth High School, Poth
Stockdale High School, Stockdale

Winkler County

Kermit High School, Kermit
Wink High School, Wink

Wise County

Alvord High School, Alvord
Boyd High School, Boyd
Chico High School, Chico
Decatur High School, Decatur
Paradise High School, Paradise
Slidell High School, Slidell

Bridgeport

Bridgeport High School
Wise County Special Education Cooperative

Wood County

Alba-Golden High School, Alba
Hawkins High School, Hawkins
Mineola High School, Mineola
Quitman High School, Quitman
Winnsboro High School, Winnsboro
Yantis High School, Yantis

Yoakum County

Denver City High School, Denver City
Plains High School, Plains

Young County

Graham High School, Graham
Newcastle High School, Newcastle
Olney High School, Olney

Zapata County
Zapata High School, Zapata

Zavala County

Crystal City High School, Crystal City
La Pryor High School, La Pryor

See also 
List of school districts in Texas
List of schools in Harris County, Texas

References

External links
 Texas Education Agency
 

Texas
High